Timeless Passages is a Big Finish Productions audio drama featuring Lisa Bowerman as Bernice Summerfield, a character from the spin-off media based on the long-running British science fiction television series Doctor Who.

Plot 
For years the great Labyrinth of Kerykeion has been home to one of the largest libraries of human incunabula in the galaxy. Here, otherwise lost volumes are all carefully preserved. From tomorrow, it is under new management. Professor Bernice Summerfield is sent to acquire some of the rarest books for the Braxiatel Collection before the new corporate owners bulldoze their way in. She is hoping for a quiet time searching the archives. Some chance. Soon she is investigating a horrible murder and is caught up in a last-ditch scheme to save the entire library. There is a vicious, insane killer cyborg on Benny's heels. And then ancient subterranean powers begin to stir.

Cast
Bernice Summerfield - Lisa Bowerman
Samuel Wolfe - Toby Longworth
Archibald Spool - Keith Drinkel
Hermione - Katarina Olsson

External links
Big Finish Productions - Professor Bernice Summerfield: Timeless Passages 

Timeless Passages
Fiction set in the 27th century